A snob screen is a device found in some British public houses of the Victorian era.  Usually installed in sets, they comprise an etched glass pane in a movable wooden frame and were intended to allow middle class drinkers to see working class drinkers in an adjacent bar, but not to be seen by them, and to be undisturbed by the bar staff.

Pubs with surviving snob screens include:

 The Bartons Arms, Birmingham
 Bunch of Grapes, London SW3
 The Champion, London 
 The Crown and Greyhound, Dulwich Village London (the screens have been re-sited)
 The Gate, London N22
 John Leslie's, Ratcliffe Terrace, Edinburgh
 The Lamb, Bloomsbury, London
 Posada, Wolverhampton
 Prince Alfred, Maida Vale, London
 Princess Louise, Holborn, London
 Crown, London N1
 Nova Scotia, Bristol

References 

Pubs
Architecture in the United Kingdom
Victorian architecture